Yau Oi is an MTR Light Rail stop located at ground level on Yau Oi Road near Yau Oi Car Park, Yau Oi Estate in Tuen Mun District, Hong Kong. It began service on 18 September 1988 and belongs to Zone 2. The stop only has one platform, which is used for the terminus of route 751.

MTR Light Rail stops
Former Kowloon–Canton Railway stations
Tuen Mun District
Railway stations in Hong Kong opened in 1988
MTR Light Rail stops named from housing estates